Camelot House is a grade II listed building at 53 Beech Hill (originally Camlet Way), Hadley Wood. The house was built around 1875–80 by the builder Frederick Lambert.

The house was also once known as Broadgates House and a Broadgates Avenue exists nearby.

References 

Grade II listed buildings in the London Borough of Enfield
Houses in the London Borough of Enfield
Hadley Wood
Grade II listed houses in London